Dopastin is a chemical compound produced by the bacteria Pseudomonas No. BAC-125.  It was first isolated and characterized in 1972.  It is an inhibitor of the enzyme dopamine β-hydroxylase.

Dopastin can be prepared synthetically from L-valinol.

References 

Nitrosamines
Dopamine beta hydroxylase inhibitors
Hydroxylamines